Lawrence Nigel Jones  (born 1 August 1968)  He is the co-founder and was the CEO of the Manchester-based colocation, dedicated and cloud hosting provider, UKFast.

Early life 
Lawrence Jones was born in Denbigh, North Wales. At 7 years old he won a scholarship to sing and study music at Durham Chorister School before attending Ruthin School School when he was 13 years old. At 16 years he left home and moved to Manchester.

Career 
Jones formed UKFast with his partner Gail in 1999.

The cloud hosting and colocation business operates a data centre complex in Trafford Park, Manchester, and has over 350 employees. In 2018, the firm's turnover was £53.9million.

In December 2018 Jones sold a 30% stake of UKFast for £205m to private equity firm Inflexion and in May 2020 it was reported in The Financial Times that Jones and his wife "have both now left the business and will no longer have any role in it".

In May 2010 Jones joined the board of the Manchester Camerata.

He owns Castell Cidwm estate near the village of Betws Garmon; it was originally owned by the Marquis of Anglesey, who used the Castell Cidwm country house as his hunting lodge. He has built a wall that has prevented local people from accessing the lake, causing considerable local objections.

Jones acquired Le Farinet Hotel in Swiss ski resort Verbier in September 2014.

In June 2017 Jones launched a podcast offering business advice and sharing inspirational stories from people including Sir Richard Branson, Gary Neville and Stacey Copeland.

Honours and awards

In 2012, Jones was named Ernst & Young Technology Entrepreneur of the Year and, in 2013, he received 'Director of the Year for a Small to Medium Company' at the Institute of Directors' awards ceremony.

He was appointed Member of the Order of the British Empire (MBE) in the 2015 New Years Honours List for services to the digital economy.

In July 2016 Jones received an honorary doctorate in Business Administration (DBA) from Manchester Metropolitan University

Personal life
Lawrence and Gail Jones have four daughters. They live in Cheshire, England.

In 2001, Jones was caught in an avalanche whilst skiing off-piste in Alpe D'huez, France. Buried for 8 minutes Jones was resuscitated before being airlifted to Grenoble hospital.

In October 2019, an investigation by the Financial Times reported that Lawrence faced multiple allegations by former employees of bullying, sexual harassment and sexual assault. Many of the allegations include claims of unwanted physical contact and verbal abuse in the work place and molestation whilst on company trips abroad. This resulted in his resignation and the prospect his wife Gail would become CEO. An internal investigation into the allegations started in late October 2019, which UKFast is quoted as "taking very seriously".

As of 1 November 2019, Greater Manchester Police have confirmed that they have interviewed Jones in relation to two allegations of sexual assault and that enquiries are ongoing.

In January 2021 he was charged with one count of rape and four counts of sexual assault. In April 2021 he was charged with a further count of rape. Trial for the first charges is scheduled for February 2022.

External links
 Lawrence Jones's blog 
 UKFast

References

1968 births
Businesspeople from Manchester
Welsh chief executives
Living people
Members of the Order of the British Empire
People from Denbigh